La Seigneurie is the traditional residence of the Seigneur of Sark. The Seigneur is the head of Sark in the Channel Islands.

Michael Beaumont, 22nd Seigneur of Sark, and his wife, Diana, moved from the Seigneurie to a smaller cottage on their estate when frail health triggered a need for a smaller residence that was better suited to aging residents. In 2009, Michael Beaumont agreed to allow David Synnott and his wife to live in the Seigneurie  for ten years, in return for making some renovations.

Michael Beaumont died on 3 July 2016 and was succeeded by his eldest son, Major Christopher Beaumont.

Both the House and the gardens of the Seigneurie were open to the public as of 2018.

References

Seigneurs of Sark
Sark
Buildings and structures in the Channel Islands